Fernando Luis Alvarez is an American art gallerist, patron of the arts and art activist based in Stamford, Connecticut. He is known as the founder of his eponymous art gallery and Clementina Arts Foundation.

Biography

Early life 
Alvarez was born in Greenwich, Connecticut, and he was moved to Colombia at the age of three, where he lived with his grandmother till the age of twelve. Alvarez went through the school system from elementary to Greenwich High School. He then moved to London to pursue higher study from Richmond, The American International University in London in International Business & Finance, Economics and Political Science. In 2008, he started working with collector and gallerist Allan Stone. In the same year, while working at the Stone residence, he started the solo studio, Greenwich Soho Factory in Greenwich and in 2009 he founded the Fernando Luis Alvarez Gallery in Stamford,Connecticut which opened its second wing in the year 2013.

Other activities 
From 2013 to 2015,  Alvarez sought to turn around the underprivilege afterschool programs provided by the Yerwood Center. A Stamford, CT non-profit organization named after Joyce Yerwood and known for working with disadvantaged youth, Alvarez became chairman of the board.  He was responsible for removing the team managing the center, which had been under financial distress for the last decade. In order to raise funds for the failing Center few wanted to save, Alvarez’ strategy was to focus on the legacy and continued importance of Dr. Joyce Yerwood. This involved approaching women-only leaders to raise the necessary funds required to return the center to solvency From 2012 to 2017, he has served on the board of the Stamford Downtown.

In 2015, he founded the non profit organization Clementina Arts Foundation paying a tribute to his grandmother's social work. The organization is known for providing educational programs for kids about arts and supports for the struggling artists. To achieve such goals, It offers various programs including Sprouting Spaces and Kid Contemporary.

Activism 
In June 2018, as the part of the Opioid: Express Yourself! exhibition at his art gallery, Alvarez executed a guerrilla installations activism with fabricator Domenic Esposito who created a significant sculpture. This later became known as the spoon movement, to draw attention to the pervasive opioid crisis. The art activism involved temporary installation of a 10 feet long, 800 pound steel spoon that represented a ‘heroin spoon’. It was deposited in front of the headquarters of Purdue Pharma to manifest symbolic protest against the lack of "accountability" for promoting and encouraging opioid usage, leading to the opioid endemic in the United States.

Alvarez later said that he selected Purdue pharma office premises to emphasize legal scrutiny the company was facing with its opioid painkiller OxyContin regarding its unscrupulous prescribing practices which contributed to increased patient misuse and the opioid crisis situation. Though Purdue pharma claimed that they ceased promoting the drug by February that year and have significantly reduced the "sales force" in June just before the incident took place.

Alvarez was charged with "a criminal misdemeanor and a felony" for installation of the spoon sculpture and was arrested. The sculpture was confiscated but later returned to Esposito. Alvarez avoided being sent to jail, was allowed to participate in an accelerated rehabilitation program and was cleared of the charges on the condition he stay away from the Purdue Pharma for one year.

In December that year, Alvarez announced that his eponymous gallery would be closed from January 2019. In 2019, Purdue Pharma while dealing with thousands of lawsuits, filed for bankruptcy and consequently went through a restructuration.

As an extension of the spoon movement, Alvarez initiated the curtain movement in December 2020, which is another form of guerrilla installations activism. Curtains are used to highlight the importance of awareness about opioid endemic.

As the part of the curtain movement, in March 2021, a curtain was installed in front of the Purdue Pharma headquarters which read “FDA’s Dr. Janet Woodcock must go!”, alleging FDA Commissioner Janet Woodcock as one of the “enablers of the opioid epidemic" and with the aim to “dissuade the Biden administration from nominating Dr. Janet Woodcock for FDA commissioner”.

Alvarez currently co-chairs The Global Recovery Movement (TGRM) with Dan Schneider, The Pharmacist. An international coalition fighting the opioid/fentanyl epidemic, TGRM's mission is to flip the discrimination of the criminal justice approach to substance use towards a proven public health solution.

See also 

 Guerrilla art
 Artivism

References

External links 

 Fernando Luis Alvarez Gallery
 Clementina Arts Foundation
 The Spoon Movement
 The Curtain Movement

Living people
Directors of museums in the United States
American art dealers
American art patrons
American art collectors
American activists
Culture jamming
Year of birth missing (living people)